Johnny Ross (May 28, 1942 – February 9, 2006) was an American multi-instrumentalist, singer-songwriter and founding member of Baby Huey & the Babysitters, who died in 2006 as a result of appendicitis. He also hosted his own cable television show.

Biography
John W. Ross Jr was born in Miller, Indiana, United States. Along with Melvyn "Deacon" Jones and James Ramey aka Baby Huey, Ross was a founding member of Baby Huey & the Babysitters. He stayed with the Babysitters for nearly a decade and during that time he wrote two of their songs, "Monkey Man" and "Just Being Careful". "Monkey Man" appears on numerous 1960s various artists compilations including Pittsburghs Greatest Hits, Teenage Shutdown: Jump, Jive and Harmonize, Mad Mike's Monstors Vol 3

After he left the Babysitters he went solo and recorded some soul singles including, "I Can't Help Myself", which appeared on a Northern soul dance compilation.

In later years
From the early 1990s until the time of his death Ross and his wife managed Ross Music and Video Productions. He scored music for television shows and commercials for brands such as Sears and Mattel toys.

He had a cable television show Creating Music that ran for ten years. Among the guests were Mo' Beat Blues, members of Michael Jackson's extended family, Gary Mayor Scott King who played bass, and members of The Spaniels.

From the early 2000s he composed movie soundtracks including two for Fred "The Hammer" Williamson. They were Down 'n Dirty and On The Edge.

Ross also managed security for many municipal events and personally handled security for Coretta Scott King, the widow of Rev. Dr. Martin Luther King Jr.

Death 
He died on February 9, 2006, as a result of heart failure after appendicitis, at the age of 63.

Television
 The Johnny Ross Show, Creating Music – (c) 1994 – 2006 (Cable)

Soundtrack
 Down 'n Dirty – 2000
 On The Edge – 2002

Discography

Singles
 Johnny Ross & The Soul Explosions – "I Can't Help Myself" / "Sore Loser" – Chirrup 1523
 Electric City Featuring Johnny Ross – "Gemini" / "We're Gonna Make It" – 20th Century Fox TC-2360 (1977)

Compilation albums
 Northern Soul Story 4 – Soul Supply Records LPSD 121 – 1987 – Johnny Ross & The Soul Explosions  –  I Can't Help Myself (2 LP)
 Northern Soul Dance Party  Goldmine GSCD46 – Johnny Ross & the Soul Explosion – "I Can't Help Myself"
 Down 'n Dirty (Soundtrack) – Select-O-Hits – 2000

References

1942 births
2006 deaths
People from Morgan County, Indiana
American soul singers
American multi-instrumentalists
American blues singers
Songwriters from Indiana
20th-century American singers